The 1984 Copa del Rey was the 48th edition of the Spanish basketball Cup. For the first time, it was organized by the ACB and played, for the first time in decades, with a Final Four format. Zaragoza hosted the Cup at the Palacio Municipal de Deportes.

This edition was played by the two first qualified teams of the 1983–84 ACB first stage.

Qualified teams

Group Odd

|}

Group Even

|}

Bracket

Final
CAI Zaragoza won its first title ever thanks to a great performance of Kevin Magee.

References

External links
Boxscores at ACB.com 
Linguasport

Copa del Rey de Baloncesto
Copa